Elapoidis is a genus of snakes endemic to Indonesia and Malaysia.

Species
 Elapoidis fusca (Boie, 1826)
 Elapoidis sumatrana (Bleeker, 1860)

References

Colubrids
Snake genera
Reptiles of Malaysia
Reptiles of Indonesia